The Ponts Couverts are a set of three bridges and four towers that make up a defensive work erected in the 13th century on the River Ill in the city of Strasbourg in France. The three bridges cross the four river channels of the River Ill that flow through Strasbourg's historic Petite France quarter. The Ponts Couverts have been classified as a Monument historique since 1928.

Construction of the Ponts Couverts commenced in 1230, and they were opened in 1250. As a defensive mechanism, they were superseded by the Barrage Vauban, just upstream, in 1690, but remained in use as bridges. As built, each of the bridges was covered by a wooden roof that served to protect the defenders who would have been stationed on them in time of war. These roofs were removed in 1784, but name Ponts Couverts (covered bridges) has remained in common use ever since.

Gallery

References

External links
Ponts Couverts  on archi-wiki.org 

Bridges in France
Fortifications in France
Towers in France
Buildings and structures completed in 1250
Monuments historiques of Strasbourg
Tourist attractions in Strasbourg
Brick Gothic
Gothic architecture in Strasbourg